Vladimír Menšík (9 October 1929 – 29 May 1988) was a popular Czech actor and entertainer, born in Ivančice, Moravia, Czechoslovakia.

Both comedian and serious actor, he created a wide range of lively characters. He starred in more than 120 movies (September Nights, Král Šumavy, Hledá se táta, The Cassandra Cat, Lemonade Joe, Loves of a Blonde, The Cremator, Zítra vstanu a opařím se čajem, Marketa Lazarová, Všichni dobří rodáci, Tři oříšky pro Popelku, Jak utopit doktora Mráčka, Dobří holubi se vracejí), television films (Zlatí úhoři) and TV miniseries (Byl jednou jeden dům, Arabela, Pan Tau, Návštěvníci, Létající Čestmír).

External links

 
 Vladimír Menšík (in Czech) Life, work, epoch
 
 Ivančice
 School bearing Menšík's name, with some pictures and facts (in Czech)

1929 births
1988 deaths
People from Ivančice
Czech male film actors
Czech male television actors
20th-century Czech male actors
Janáček Academy of Music and Performing Arts alumni